Shabda Ratnakaram is a Telugu language dictionary written by B. Sitaramacharyulu. It is known as one of the Telugu literary accomplishments.

References

Telugu-language literature
Telugu dictionaries